Brown Township is one of thirteen townships in Washington County, Indiana, United States. As of the 2010 census, its population was 1,199 and it contained 545 housing units.

Geography

Cities, towns, villages
 Campbellsburg
 Saltillo

Unincorporated towns
 Brimstone Corners at 
 Fairview at 
 Mount Carmel at 
(This list is based on USGS data and may include former settlements.)

Adjacent townships
 Carr Township, Jackson County (northeast)
 Jefferson Township (east)
 Vernon Township (south)
 Northeast Township, Orange County (southwest)
 Bono Township, Lawrence County (west)
 Guthrie Township, Lawrence County (northwest)

Cemeteries
The township contains these two cemeteries: Mount Carmeltoe and New Hope.

Rivers
 East Fork White River

School districts
 West Washington School Corporation

Political districts
 Indiana's 9th congressional district
 State House District 62
 State Senate District 44

References
 United States Census Bureau 2007 TIGER/Line Shapefiles
 United States Board on Geographic Names (GNIS)
 IndianaMap

External links
 Indiana Township Association
 United Township Association of Indiana

Townships in Washington County, Indiana
Townships in Indiana